Route 237 is a bypass road linking Catalina, Trinity Bay (situated on Route 230) with Newman's Cove, Bonavista Bay (situated on Route 235). It is refer to as Church Street despite lack of signage as St. Peter's Anglican Church is located on the highway in Catalina.

There are no other communities along this highway, no other highways intersect it beyond the Routes 230 and 235. Within Catalina the highway is connected with local streets (Bond Street, Guys Lane, Harts Road). The entire length of the roadway is paved with single lane in either direction.

Major intersections

References

237